Ulayu Pingwartok (1904 – 1978) was a Canadian Inuk artist known for drawings of domestic scenes and nature.

Biography 
Pingwartok was born on April 7, 1904, in Lake Harbour (Kimmirut) on southwestern Baffin Island in the Northwest Territories, now Nunavut. She moved into the settlement of Cape Dorset in 1959 where she started to draw and was encouraged to create drawings for the annual print collections.

Artwork 
“Pingwartok produced over seven hundred drawings in her life, and thirty of them were translated into prints for ten annual Cape Dorset collections between 1965 and 1979.” Her early prints were portraits of birds, focusing on precise depiction of feather. She later concentrated in women’s activities on a traditional camp life and shelter such as tents and igloos.

Art career 
Along with being exhibited in Cape Dorset Graphics, Pingwartok was a part of many group exhibitions in Canada and the United States, including “The Inuit Print.”  She had a solo show, “Ulayu,” that toured from 1982-1984. Her work is collected by the National Gallery of Canada, Royal Ontario Museum, the Canadian Museum of Civilization, Winnipeg Art Gallery, and the McMichael Canadian Art Collection.

Her disc number was E7-1038.

Exhibitions 
Cape Dorset Graphics (annual collection and illustrated catalogue) 1965, 1966, 1967, 1969, 1974, 1975, 1976, 1977, 1978, 1979
 January - February 1967 Cape Dorset - A Decade of Eskimo, Prints & Recent Sculpture, National Gallery of Canada in cooperation with the Canadian Eskimo Art Committee, Ottawa, Ontario
 June - July 1967      4th National Burnaby Print Show, Burnaby Art Society, Burnaby, British Columbia
 1970       Graphic Art by Eskimos of Canada: Second Collection, Cultural Affairs Division, Department of External Affairs, Ottawa, Ontario
 September - Oct 1970      Canadian Eskimo Arts Festival, Alaska Methodist University Galleries, Anchorage, Alaska, U.S.A.
 January - February 1971      The Art of the Eskimo, Simon Fraser Gallery, Simon Fraser University, Burnaby, British Columbia
 1976      Cape Dorset Prints, London Art Gallery, Organized for the Central Huron Library, Clinton, Ontario
 Jan 1977 - June 1982      The Inuit Print/L'estampe inuit, Department of Indian Affairs and Northern Development and the National Museum of Man, Ottawa, Ontario
 July 1979 - Oct 1981        Images of the Inuit: from the Simon Fraser Collection, Simon Fraser Gallery, Simon Fraser University, Burnaby, British Columbia
 August - October 1980     The Inuit Amautik:  I Like My Hood To Be Full, Winnipeg Art Gallery, Winnipeg, Manitoba
 September 1983               The Way We Were - Traditional Eskimo Life, Snow Goose Associates, Seattle, Washington, USA
 October - Nov 1983          The Cape Dorset Print, Presented at Rideau Hall by Indian and Northern Affairs Canada, Ottawa, Ontario
 September - Oct 1984     On the Land, The Arctic Circle, Los Angeles, California, U.S.A.
 May - June 1987              Inuit Graphics from the Past, Arctic Artistry, Scarsdale, New York, U.S.A.
 Dec 1987 - March 1989      Contemporary Inuit Drawings, Macdonald Stewart Art Centre, Guelph, Ontario
 March - April 1988           Works on Paper from the Permanent Collection of Inuit Art, Canadian Guild of Crafts Quebec,  Montréal, Quebec
 September 1988             Canadian Prints from the McMaster Art Gallery Collection, McMaster Art Gallery, Hamilton, Ontario
 August - October 1989      Inuit Graphic Art from Indian & Northern Affairs Canada, Winnipeg Art Gallery, Winnipeg, Manitoba
 June - September 1990      Inuit Graphics and Drawings from 1959-1990, Arctic Artistry, Hastings-on-Hudson, New York, U.S.A.
 February - March 1991      Cape Dorset Sculpture, McMaster Art Gallery, Hamilton, Ontario

Solo exhibitions 
 March 1982 - April 1984  Ulayu, Department of Indian Affairs and Northern Development, Ottawa, Ontario

Collections 

 Agnes Etherington Art Centre, Queen's University, Kingston, Ontario                      
Amon Carter Museum of Western Art, Fort Worth, Texas, U.S.A.                      
 Anchorage Museum of History and Art, Anchorage, Alaska, U.S.A.
 Art Gallery of York University, Downsview, Ontario
 Art Gallery, Memorial University of Newfoundland, St. John's, Newfoundland
 Bata Shoe Museum Foundation, Don Mills, Ontario
 Canada Council Art Bank, Ottawa, Ontario
 Canadian Guild of Crafts Quebec, Montreal, Quebec
 Canadian Museum of Civilization, Hull, Quebec
 Glenbow Museum, Calgary, Alberta
 Klamer Family Collection, Art Gallery of Ontario, Toronto, Ontario
 Laurentian University Museum and Arts Centre, Sudbury, Ontario
 London Regional Art Gallery, London, Ontario
 Macdonald Stewart Art Centre, Guelph, Ontario
 McMaster University Art Gallery, Hamilton, Ontario
 McMichael Canadian Art Collection, Kleinburg, Ontario
 Mendel Art Gallery, Saskatoon, Saskatchewan
 Museum of Anthropology, University of British Columbia, Vancouver, British Columbia 
 National Gallery of Canada, Ottawa, Ontario 
National Museum of the American Indian, Washington, D.C. 
 Prince of Wales Northern Heritage Centre, Yellowknife, Northwest Territories
 Red Deer and District Museum and Archives, Red Deer, Alberta
 Royal Ontario Museum, Toronto, Ontario
 Simon Fraser Gallery, Simon Fraser University, Burnaby, British Columbia
 Toronto-Dominion Bank Collection, Toronto, Ontario
 University of Lethbridge Art Gallery, Lethbridge, Alberta
University of Michigan Museum of Art, Ann Arbor, Michigan, U.S.A. 
 Whyte Museum of the Canadian Rockies, Banff, Alberta
 Winnipeg Art Gallery, Winnipeg, Manitoba
 York University, Toronto, Ontario

References

1904 births
1978 deaths
Inuit artists
Canadian Inuit women
People from Kinngait
Artists from Nunavut
Inuit from the Northwest Territories
People from Kimmirut
20th-century Canadian women artists
Women printmakers
20th-century Canadian printmakers